The Americas Zone will be one of the three regional zones of the 2019 Davis Cup.

In the Americas Zone there were three different tiers, called groups. The winners of the Group I ties in September will earn a place in the 2020 Davis Cup Qualifiers.

Participating nations
<onlyinclude>

Seeds: 

Remaining nations:

Results summary

Results

Brazil vs. Barbados

Venezuela vs. Ecuador

Uruguay vs. Dominican Republic

References

External links
Official Website

Americas Zone Group I
Davis Cup Americas Zone
Davis Cup Americas Zone Group 1